Gerstetten is a municipality in the district of Heidenheim in Baden-Württemberg in southern Germany.

It consists of the following villages:
 Gerstetten (population: 7,534)
 Dettingen (population: 2,042, incorporation 1972)
 Gussenstadt (population: 1,533, incorporation 1971)
 Heldenfingen (population: 1,052, incorporation 1971)
 Heuchlingen (population: 924, incorporation 1974)
 Heuchstetten (population: 137)
 and Sontbergen (population: 56, incorporation 1974).
The total population of the municipality is 12,009 (population figures as of September 2004).

Politics
The current mayor is Roland Polaschek.

Twin towns
Gerstetten has two twin towns: Cébazat, a small town near Clermont-Ferrand in France and Pilisvörösvár (German: Werischwar) in Hungary, about 20 km from Budapest.

  Cébazat (near Clermont-Ferrand), France (Auvergne) since  June 27, 1992
  Pilisvörösvár, Hungary since May 5, 1996

Notable people
1578 Andreas Josua Ulsheimer, † ???, born in Gerstetten, doctor and world traveller
1831, 3. August, Christian Fink, † 4. September 1911 in Esslingen, born in Dettingen, musician, composer and pedagogue
1841, 10. March, Friedrich Fink, † 19. December 1896 in Stuttgart, born in Dettingen am Albuch, musician, composer 
1896, 16. July, Gottlob Berger, † 5. January 1975 in Stuttgart, war criminal, SS-Obergruppenführer and Waffen-SS general
1906, 1. March, Heinrich Roth, † 7. July 1983 in Göttingen, psychologist
1931, 23. August, Günther Steeb, economist, member of Landtag
1933, 11. June, Walther Zügel, banker
1940, 21. July, Heide Gerstenberger, politics and economy scientist
1965, Johannes Zimmermann, theologian, professor in Greifswald
1971, Birgite Gebhardt, singer and music-cabaret-artist

References

External links
 

Heidenheim (district)